How Long Will I Love U is a 2018 Chinese fantasy romantic comedy film written and directed by Su Lun, based on an idea by Xu Zheng who also produced the film. The film stars Tong Liya and Lei Jiayin, and tells a story about a young woman from 2018 and a young man from 1999 who become roommates after a spacetime merge inside their apartment.

Reportedly filmed on a ¥40 million budget, How Long Will I Love U grossed ¥900 million ($130 million) in China where it premiered on 18 May 2018. Foreign critics generally note the fine on-screen chemistry between Lei and Tong, who previously co-starred in the 2013 TV series Weaning.

Cast
 Lei Jiayin as Lu Ming, a down-on-his-luck property designer in 1999
Lei Jiayin as Lu Shiyi, a billionaire, whom Lu Ming "became" in 2018
 Tong Liya as Gu Xiaojiao, a frustrated young woman in 2018
Han Jiaying as Young Gu Xiaojiao in 1999
Zhang Yi as Zhao Junyi, Lu Ming's supervisor (in 1999)
 Wang Zhengjia as Gu Qixiang, Gu Xiaojiao's father and Zhao Junyi's boss (in 1999)
 Yang Le as Xiaoma, real estate agent (in 2018)
 Fan Ming as Potato wholesaler (in 2018)
 Xu Zheng as Noodle (Lamian) Chef (in 2018)
 Tao Hong as Gu Xiaojiao's supervisor (in 2018)
 Li Nian as Xiaoya, Gu Xiaojiao's former classmate (in 2018)
 Li Guangjie as Sicheng, Xiaoya's husband (in 2018)
 Yang Di as Waiter (in 2018)
 Yu Hewei as Scientist

Soundtrack

Production
Su Lun was hired as director and screenwriter, Xu Zheng read her drafts and gave notes for improvement.

The film pays homage to Alejandro Agresti's The Lake House and Robert Schwentke's The Time Traveler's Wife.

Lei Jiayin said that Liu Haoran was considered for the role of young Lu Ming, but because of funding problems, he had to play the role's youth and adulthood.

Production started on September 8, 2017 in Shanghai and ended on November 14 of that same year.

Release

On April 4, 2018, the crew announced that the film was scheduled for release on May 18, 2018. On April 15, the cast and crew attended the Press Conference in Beijing. On April 26, the first official trailer for the film was released along with a teaser poster.

How Long Will I Love Us opening day gross was 52.5 million yuan, by the weekend, the film's accumulated grossed reached 236 million yuan.

According to Box Office Mojo, the film grossed $136.7 million in 4 international markets.

Awards2018 China Movie Channel Media AwardsWon—Best New Director, Su LunWon'''—Best Actress, Tong Liya
Nominated—Best Actor, Lei Jiayin

See alsoMeet Me @ 1006'', a 2018 Taiwanese TV series with a similar premise

References

External links
 
 
 

2018 films
Chinese romantic comedy films
Films shot in Shanghai
Films about time travel
Films set in 1999
Films set in 2018
Chinese fantasy films
2018 romantic comedy films
2018 fantasy films
2010s Mandarin-language films